VIII Turkmenistan President's Cup (2002)

Group A

Group B

Third Place

Final 

 

2002
Presidents Cup
2002 in Russian football
2002 in Uzbekistani football
2002 in Estonian football
2002 in Lithuanian football
2002–03 in Ukrainian football
2002–03 in Turkish football
2002–03 in Georgian football